The Patiala and East Punjab States Union (PEPSU) was a state of India, uniting eight princely states between 1948 and 1956. The capital and principal city was Patiala. The state covered an area of 26,208 km². Shimla, Kasauli, Kandaghat and Chail also became part of the PEPSU.

History

Princely states union 
It was created by combining eight princely states, which maintained their native rulers :
 Six Salute states 
 Patiala, title Maharaja, Hereditary salute of 17-guns (19-guns local)
 Jind, title Maharaja, Hereditary salute of 13-guns (15-guns personal and local)
 Kapurthala, title Maharaja, Hereditary salute of 13-guns (15-guns personal and local)
 Nabha, title Maharaja, Hereditary salute of 13-guns (15-guns local):
 Faridkot, title Raja, Hereditary salutes of 11-guns
 Malerkotla, title Nawab, Hereditary salute of 11-guns

 and two Non-salute states
 Kalsia, title Raja (till 1916 Sardar)
 Nalagarh, title Raja.

The state was inaugurated on 15 July 1948 and formally became a state of India in 1950.

Successor states 

On 1 November 1956, PEPSU was merged mostly into Punjab State  following the States Reorganisation Act.

A part of the former state of PEPSU, including the present day Jind district and the Narnaul tehsil in north Haryana as well as the Loharu tehsil, Charkhi Dadri district and Mahendragarh district in southwest Haryana, presently lie within the state of Haryana, which was separated from Punjab on 1 November 1966. Some other areas that belonged to PEPSU, notably Solan and Nalagarh, now lie in the state of Himachal Pradesh.

Rajpramukh and Uparajpramukh

Chief Ministers

Deputy Chief Minister

Institutions

Heads of state and government 
When the state was formed, the then-Maharaja of Patiala, Yadavindra Singh, was appointed its Rajpramukh (equivalent to Governor). He remained in office during the entire length of the state's short existence. The then Maharaja of Kapurthala, Jagatjit Singh, served as Uparajpramukh (lieutenant-governor).

Gian Singh Rarewala was sworn in on 13 January 1949 as the first Chief Minister of PEPSU. Col. Raghbir Singh became the next Chief Minister on 23 May 1951, and Brish Bhan the Deputy Chief Minister.

The state elected a 60-member state legislative assembly on 6 January 1952. The Congress Party won 26 seats and the Akali Dal won 19 seats.

On 22 April 1952, Gian Singh Rarewala again became Chief Minister, this time an elected one. He led a coalition government, called the "United Front", formed by the Akali Dal and various independents. On 5 March 1953 his government was dismissed and President's rule was imposed on the state. In the mid-term poll that followed, the Congress party secured a majority and Raghbir Singh became Chief Minister on 8 March 1954. Upon his death, Brish Bhan became the Chief Minister on 12 January 1955 and remained in office as last incumbent.

Subdivisions 
Initially, in 1948, the state was divided into the following eight districts:
 Patiala
 Nabha
 Jind
 Faridkot
 Kalsian
 Kapurthala
 Malerkotla
 Nalagarh

In 1953, the number of districts was reduced from eight to five. Barnala district became part of Sangrur district and Kohistan and Fatehgarh districts became part of Patiala district.

There were four Lok Sabha constituencies in this state. Three of them were single-seat constituency: Mohindergarh, Sangrur and Patiala. The Kapurthala-Bhatinda Lok Sabha constituency was a double-seat constituency.

Demography 
The state had a population of 3,493,685 (1951 census), of which 19% was urban. The population density was 133/km².

Notes

References

Further reading 
 Singh, Gursharan (1991). History of PEPSU, India: Patiala and East Punjab States Union, 1948-1956, Delhi: Konark Publishers, .

1948 establishments in India
1956 disestablishments in India
States and territories established in 1948
History of Haryana (1947–present)
Patiala
History of Punjab, India (1947–present)
Former states and territories of India